Pululahua is a dormant volcano in the north of Quito Canton, Pichincha Province, Ecuador. The volcano is in the Western Cordillera of the northern Ecuadorian Andes, approximately west-southwest of Mojanda and north of Casitahua volcanoes. Pululahua's caldera is approximately 5 km wide.

The volcano is within an Ecuadorian national park known as Reserva Geobotánica Pululahua.

In 467 BCE, Pululahua erupted, sending volcanic ash over much of the western Ecuadorian lowland regions, which greatly reduced the expressions of the Chorrera and Cotocollao cultures.

Notes

References
Zeidler, J. A. "The Ecuadorian Formative." Helaine Silverman and William H. Isbell, eds. Handbook of South American Archaeology. New York: Springer, 2008. .

Quito Canton
Volcanoes of Ecuador
Calderas of Ecuador
Geography of Pichincha Province
Pleistocene volcanoes
Holocene volcanoes